Ivan Oleksandrovych Kovalenko (born 10 March 1999) is a professional Ukrainian footballer who plays as a left-back for Metalist 1925 Kharkiv in the Ukrainian Premier League.

References

External links
 Personal statistics at UAF website (Ukr)
 Profile on Metalist 1925 Kharkiv official website
 

1999 births
Living people
Ukrainian footballers
FC Metalist 1925 Kharkiv players
Ukrainian Premier League players
Ukrainian First League players
Ukrainian Second League players
Association football defenders